Coalbrookdale is a village in the Ironbridge Gorge in Shropshire, England, containing a settlement of great significance in the history of iron ore smelting. It lies within the civil parish called the Gorge.

This is where iron ore was first smelted by Abraham Darby using easily mined "coking coal". The coal was drawn from drift mines in the sides of the valley. As it contained far fewer impurities than normal coal, the iron it produced was of a superior quality. Along with many other industrial developments that were going on in other parts of the country, this discovery was a major factor in the growing industrialisation of Britain, which was to become known as the Industrial Revolution. Today, Coalbrookdale is home to the Ironbridge Institute, a partnership between the University of Birmingham and the Ironbridge Gorge Museum Trust offering postgraduate and professional development courses in heritage.

Before Abraham Darby
Before the Dissolution of the Monasteries, Madeley and the adjacent Little Wenlock belonged to Much Wenlock Priory. At the Dissolution there was a bloomsmithy called "Caldebroke Smithy". The manor passed about 1572 to John Brooke, who developed coal mining in his manor on a substantial scale. His son Sir Basil Brooke was a significant industrialist, and invested in ironworks elsewhere. It is probable that he also had ironworks at Coalbrookdale, but evidence is lacking. He also acquired an interest in the patent for the cementation process of making steel in about 1615. Though forced to surrender the patent in 1619, he continued making iron and steel until his estate was sequestrated during the Civil War, but the works continued in use.

In 1651, the manor was leased to Francis Wolfe, the clerk of the ironworks, and he and his son operated them as tenant of (or possibly manager for) Brooke's heirs. The surviving old blast furnace contains a cast-iron lintel bearing a date, which is currently painted as 1638, but an archive photograph has been found showing it as 1658. What ironworks existed at Coalbrookdale and from precisely what dates thus remains obscure. By 1688, the ironworks were operated by Lawrence Wellington, but a few years after the furnace was occupied by Shadrach Fox. He renewed the lease in 1696, letting the Great Forge and Plate Forge to Wellington. Some evidence may suggest that Shadrach Fox smelted iron with mineral coal, though this remains controversial. Fox was evidently an iron founder, as he supplied round shot and grenado shells to the Board of Ordnance during the Nine Years War, but not later than April 1703, the furnace blew up. It remained derelict until the arrival of Abraham Darby the Elder in 1709. However the forges remained in use. A brass works was built sometime before 1712 (possibly as early as 1706), but closed in 1714.

Industrial Revolution

In 1709, the first Abraham Darby rebuilt Coalbrookdale Furnace, and eventually used coke as his fuel. His business was that of an ironfounder, making cast-iron pots and other goods, an activity in which he was particularly successful because of his patented foundry method, which enabled him to produce cheaper pots than his rivals. Coalbrookdale has been claimed as the home of the world's first coke-fired blast furnace; this is not strictly correct, but it was the first in Europe to operate successfully for more than a few years.

Darby renewed his lease of the works in 1714, forming a new partnership with John Chamberlain and Thomas Baylies. They built a second furnace in about 1715, which was intended to be followed up with a furnace in Wales at Dolgûn near Dolgellau and in Cheshire taking over Vale Royal Furnace in 1718. However, Darby died prematurely at Madeley Court in 1717 - the same year as he began the house Dale End which became home to succeeding generations of the family in Coalbrookdale - followed quickly by his widow Mary. The partnership was dissolved before Mary's death, Baylies taking over Vale Royal. After Mary's death, Baylies had difficulty extracting his capital. The works then passed to a company led by his fellow Quaker Thomas Goldney II of Bristol and managed by Richard Ford (also a Quaker). Darby's son Abraham Darby the Younger was brought into the business as an assistant manager when old enough.

The company's main business was producing cast-iron goods. Molten iron for this foundry work was not only produced from the blast furnaces, but also by remelting pig iron in air furnaces, a variant of the reverberatory furnace. The Company also became early suppliers of steam engine cylinders in this period.

From 1720, the Company operated a forge at Coalbrookdale but this was not profitable. In about 1754, renewed experiments took place with the application of coke pig iron to the production of bar iron in charcoal finery forges. This proved to be a success, and led to the partners building new furnaces at Horsehay and Ketley. This was the beginning of a great expansion in coke ironmaking.

In 1767, the Company began to produce the first cast-iron rails for railways. In 1778, Abraham Darby III undertook the building of the world's first cast-iron bridge, the iconic Iron Bridge, opened 1 January 1781. The fame of this bridge leads many people today to associate the iron-making part of the Industrial Revolution with the neighbouring village of Ironbridge, but in fact most of the work was done at Coalbrookdale, as there was no settlement at Ironbridge in the eighteenth century. Expansion of Coalbrookdale's industrial facilities continued, with the development of sophisticated ponds and culverts to provide water power, and even Resolution, a water-returning beam engine to recirculate this water.

In 1795, the first porcelain factory near Coalbrookdale was founded at Coalport, east of the Iron Bridge, by William Reynolds and John Rose, producing Coalport porcelain.

In 1802, the Coalbrookdale Company built a rail locomotive for Richard Trevethick, but little is known about it, including whether or not it actually ran. The death of a company workman in an accident involving the engine is said to have caused the company to not proceed to running it on their existing railway. To date, the only known information about it comes from a drawing preserved at the Science Museum, London, together with a letter written by Trevithick to his friend Davies Giddy. The design incorporated a single horizontal cylinder enclosed in a return-flue boiler. A flywheel drove the wheels on one side through spur gears, and the axles were mounted directly on the boiler, with no frame. This was two years before Trevethick's first engine to tow a train was run at Penydarren in south Wales.

In the 19th century, Coalbrookdale was noted for its decorative ironwork. It is here (for example) that the gates of London's Hyde Park were built. Other examples include the Coalbrookdale verandah at St John's in Monmouth, Wales, and as far away as the Peacock Fountain in Christchurch, New Zealand. The blast furnaces were closed down, perhaps as early as the 1820s, but the foundries remained in use. The Coalbrookdale Company became part of an alliance of ironfounding companies called Light Castings Limited. This was absorbed by Allied Ironfounders Limited in 1929. This was in turn taken over by Glynwed which has since become Aga Foodservice.  The Coalbrookdale foundry closed in November 2017.

Several of Coalbrookdale's industrial heritage sites are to be found on the local trail: including: Coalbrookdale railway station, the Quaker Burial Ground, the Darby Houses, Tea Kettle Row and the Great Western Railway Viaduct.

Museum

In the century after the Old Blast Furnace closed, it became buried. There was a proposal for the site to be cleared and the furnace dismantled, but instead, it was decided to excavate and preserve it. It and a small museum were opened to celebrate 250 years of the Company in 1959. This became part of a larger project, the Ironbridge Gorge Museums. Its Museum of Iron is based in the Great Warehouse constructed in 1838 and Ironbridge Institute is based in the Long Warehouse, these two form the sides of an open space. On another side of which is the Old Blast Furnace, now under a building (erected in 1981) to protect it from the weather. The fourth side is a viaduct carrying the railway that delivers coal to the Ironbridge Power Station. One of the two tracks is due to be taken over by Telford Steam Railway as part of its southern extension from Horsehay. The Museum's archaeology unit continues to investigate the earlier history of Coalbrookdale, and has recently excavated the remains of the 17th century cementation furnaces, near the site of the Upper (formerly Middle) Forge.

Old Furnace
The Old Furnace began life as a typical blast furnace, but went over to coke in 1709. Abraham Darby I used it to cast pots, kettles and other goods. His grandson Abraham Darby III smelted the iron here for the first Ironbridge, the world's first iron bridge.

The lintels of the furnace bear dated inscriptions. The uppermost reads "Abraham Darby 1777", probably recording its enlargement for casting the Iron Bridge. It is unclear whether the date on one of the lower ones should be 1638 (as it is now painted) or 1658 (as shown on an old photo). The interior profile of the furnace is typical of its period, bulging around the middle, below which the boshes taper in again so that the charge descends into a narrower and hotter hearth, where the iron was molten. When Abraham Darby III enlarged the furnace, he only made the boshes wider on the front and left sides, but not on the right where doing so would have entailed moving the water wheel. The mouth of the furnace is thus off-centre.

Iron was now being made in large quantities for many customers. In the 1720s and 1730s, its main products were cast-iron cooking pots, kettles and other domestic articles. It also cast the cylinders for steam engines, and pig iron for use by other foundries. In the late 18th century, it sometimes produced structural ironwork, including for Buildwas Bridge. This was built in 1795, 2 miles up the river from the original Ironbridge. Due to advances in technology, it used only half as much cast iron despite being 30 feet (9 m) wider than the Ironbridge. The year after that, in 1796, Thomas Telford began a new project, Longdon-on-Tern Aqueduct. It carried the Shrewsbury Canal over the River Tern and was supported by cast-iron columns. Charles Bage designed and built the world's first multi-storey cast-iron-framed mill. It used only brick and iron, with no wood, to improve its fire-resistance. In the 19th century ornamental ironwork became a speciality.

Notable residents
Abraham Darby II (1711-1763), ironmaster, and his wife Abiah Darby (1716-1794), Quaker evangelist.
Abraham Darby III (1750-1794), ironmaster.
Arthur Charles Fox-Davies (1871-1928), writer and heraldic expert.

See also 
 Ironbridge Gorge Museums
 Telford new town
 Green Wood Centre
 Resolution
 Listed buildings in The Gorge

Notes

References
 Baugh, G.C. (Ed.) (1985) A History of Shropshire, Vol. XI: Telford, the Liberty & Borough of Wenlock (part), Bradford hundred, Victoria history of the counties of England, Oxford University Press ; London : Institute of Historical Research, 
 Cox, N. (1990) "Imagination and Innovation of an Industrial Pioneer: the First Abraham Darby", Industrial Archaeology Review, XII (1), pp. 127–144.
 King, P. W. (2002) "Sir Clement Clerke and the Adoption of Coal in Metallurgy", Trans. Newcomen Soc., 73A, pp. 33–52.
 King, P. W. "Technological Advance in the Severn Gorge", in P. Belford et al., Footprints of Industry: papers from the 300th anniversary conference at Coalbrookdale, 3–7 June 2009 (BAR British Series 523, 2010).
Labouchere, Rachel - Deborah Darby of Coalbrookdale -  Sessions: York, 1993.
Labouchere, Rachel - Abiah Darby of Coalbrookdale, 1716–93, Wife of Agraham Darby II - Sessions : York, 1988.
 Raistrick, Arthur (1989) Dynasty of iron founders: the Darbys and Coalbrookdale, 2nd rev. ed., Coalbrookdale : Sessions Book Trust/Ironbridge Gorge Museum Trust, 
 Thomas, E. (1999) Coalbrookdale and the Darby family: the story of the world's first industrial dynasty, York : Sessions/Ironbridge Gorge Museum Trust, 
 Trinder, B. (1978) The Darbys of Coalbrookdale, Rev. imp., London : Phillimore/Ironbridge Gorge Museum Trust, 
 Trinder, B. (1996) The Industrial Archaeology of Shropshire, Chichester : Phillimore, 
 Trinder, B. (2000) The Industrial Revolution in Shropshire, 3rd rev. ed., Chichester : Phillimore, 
 Geordan Hammond and Peter S. Forsaith (eds), Religion, Gender, and Industry: Exploring Church and Methodism in a Local Setting (Eugene, OR, Pickwick Publications, 2011).

Further reading
 
 Berg, Torsten and Berg, Peter (transl.) (2001) R.R. Angerstein's illustrated travel diary, 1753-1755: industry in England and Wales from a Swedish perspective, London : Science Museum, 
 Hammond, Geordan and Forsaith, Peter S. (eds). Religion, Gender, and Industry: Exploring Church and Methodism in a Local Setting , James Clarke & Co. (2012), .
 Scarfe, Norman (1995) Innocent espionage: the La Rochefoucauld Brothers' tour of England in 1785, Woodbridge : Boydell Press, 
 Trinder, Barrie Stuart (1988) The Most extraordinary district in the world: Ironbridge and Coalbrookdale: an anthology of visitors' impressions of Ironbridge, Coalbrookdale and the Shropshire coalfield,  2nd ed., Chichester : Phillimore/Ironbridge Gorge Museum Trust,

External links 

Coalbrookdale tour
The official Ironbridge Gorge Museum Trust site
Coalbrookdale Interactive Census, 1851
Telford Steam Railway
There was a subsidiary foundry at Liverpool which existed for over 200 years and supplied the engines and cannon for many warships out of the Mersey 

 
Telford and Wrekin
Villages in Shropshire
Industrial Revolution
Industrial history of the United Kingdom
Ironworks and steelworks in England
Ironbridge Gorge